Adolf Van Bruane (17 September 1900 – 10 November 1973) was a Belgian racing cyclist. He rode in the 1924 Tour de France, where he finished the first three of fifteen stages before dropping out before the end of the fourth stage.

References

1900 births
1973 deaths
Belgian male cyclists
Place of birth missing